Łęknica may refer to the following places:
Łęknica in Lubusz Voivodeship (west Poland)
Łęknica, Warmian-Masurian Voivodeship (north Poland)
Łęknica, West Pomeranian Voivodeship (north-west Poland)